Archbishop Doyé Teido Agama is a Christian leader within the Pentecostal Holiness and Convergence movements. He is the founder of Apostolic Pastoral Congress, a collegiate collective of Pentecostal bishops and pastors adhering to paleo-orthodoxy and was for many years the organisation’s President and its presiding prelate.  He leads the Christian Way of Life group of churches. He is a prominent figure in the Churches Together in England movement and is involved extensively in the African diaspora and black and multicultural affairs.

Agama lives in the United Kingdom, but has close ties with Nigeria.

Biography
Born in England in 1956 to Anglican parents of Nigerian origin, Agama was fostered early as a baby to a white family. In the early 1960s, he joined his natural family in Nigeria, remaining there until the mid 1970s.

Agama was ordained for Christian ministry in 1994, after a secular career in which he attained a range of management, consultancy and engineering skills and qualifications.

Agama was consecrated bishop in 2004, by Henry Paul Kontor, a Greek Orthodox (Old Calendar) bishop.

Agama's status as a bishop was reinforced in 2008 and 2010 as follows: 
 In 2008, Agama and his wife Helen were accorded special laying-on of hands by the executive board of the Joint College of African-American Pentecostal Bishops, a college led by Archbishop J. Delano Ellis. 
 In January 2010, Agama was received into the House of Bishops of the Pentecostal Churches of Christ (USA), another organisation led by Ellis, and was duly granted apostolic succession.

Agama was elevated to the status of archbishop on 19 October 2013, at a ceremony held in Southwark Cathedral, London. Ellis provided a "Consecration Mandate" which was read during the ceremony. Ellis also sent an episcopal delegation from USA to London, England. The delegation consisted of Bishop Darryl Woodson (who presided at the ceremony as chief consecrator) and Bishop Benjamin Douglass (assisting), both of these being bishops among the Pentecostal Churches of Christ (USA). Bishop Duke Akamisoko of the Anglican Diocesan of Kubwa-Abuja in Nigeria also joined in laying hands on Agama. Akamisoko is bishop of the Kubwa diocese, within the province of Abuja, in the Church of Nigeria (Anglican Communion). Bishop David Chaney, leader of the Anglican Communion of Charismatic Churches also participated. The Archbishop of Canterbury was officially represented at the consecration event by Michael Ipgrave, Bishop of Woolwich, who also represented the Diocese of Southwark. Also present in the Anglican delegation was Nigel McCulloch, retired Bishop of Manchester.

Agama became a member of the board of directors/trustees of England's national ecumenical instrument, Churches Together in England, the moderator (2012-2015) of the Forum of Churches Together in England, a member of Churches Together in England's reference group for minority ethnic Christian affairs (MECA-CTE), and a co-president of "Greater Manchester Churches Together". He became abbot of the Order of St Hadrian of Canterbury, a chivalric order under the patronage of Prince Ermias Sahle-Selassie Haile-Selassie, and having President Goodluck Jonathan of Nigeria and McCulloch among its members.

Views
Agama has a particular interest in the Christian Church of the first millennium in the British Isles and in the early monastics such as those at Whithorn (Candida Casa) (St Ninian) in Galloway, Scotland, at Iona, at Lindisfarne, and the north African Coptic (Coptic Church) (Berber) scholar-monk St Hadrian of Canterbury. Agama wrote on how insights from the first millennium can help people in their personal devotion and prayer life in the 21st century.

Agama has said that recession is nothing new to the black community in the United Kingdom, and that the experience of the majority of the members of the black community over many years has been of hardship and exile. It has been said that, in the same way, Bob Marley and other black musicians and poets often sang and wrote of the experience of living in Babylon.

In May 2013, Agama was one of 53 faith leaders (Christian, Jewish, Muslim, Hindu and Buddhist) who signed an open letter to the UK prime minister calling for a rethink of the then proposed same-sex marriage legislation for England and Wales. The signatories included a Church of England diocesan bishop Mike Hill and three Roman Catholic archbishops. The letter accused the prime minister of rushing the legislation through Parliament without proper scrutiny, and predicted that the Parliamentary Bill would, if enacted, result in serious and harmful consequences for the health of society, for family life, and for human rights such as freedom of religion and of speech.

Apostolic succession
Through its founder, Agama, the Apostolic Pastoral Congress lays claim to a measure of apostolic succession. The Apostolic Pastoral Congress does not consider apostolic succession a requisite for salvation, but does consider it a privilege to be in the chain of historical succession.

Many lines of apostolic succession converge in Agama. The lines cited in the Apostolic Pastoral Congress's 2013 ordinal booklet are as follows:

 through Greek Orthodox tradition (Old Calendar), via Metropolitan Henry Paul Kontor.
 from the Patriarchy of the East through the Syro-Chaldean Archidiocese of North America (renamed in 1992 as the Evangelical Apostolic Church of North America).
 through Wesleyan/Methodist tradition, via John Wesley, Thomas Coke (1747–1814) and Francis Asbury (1745–1816) and two hundred years of Methodism in USA to Carl Edwards Williams and Reuben Timothy Jones who on 17 April 1970 consecrated Ellis and thereby passed on their succession to the House of Bishops of the Pentecostal Churches of Christ. Williams and Jones were bishops of the Church of God in Christ. Both of them were possessors of Holy Orders from the Methodist Episcopal Church USA, Jones having been ordained by Bishop Frederick Pierce Corson, president of the World Methodist Conference.

There are other lines or streams of succession in addition to those that are mentioned in the Congress's 2013 ordinal booklet. For example:

 Russian/Ukrainian Orthodox lines also converge in Agama from James Andrew Gaines who (in 1965) had been consecrated in that tradition.
 Also, there is a line of succession from Archbishop Makarios III, patriarch of the Church of Cyprus.

 A Slavonic Orthodox line of succession comes in via William Andrew Prazsky and Anthony Prazsky who, in 1976, participated as co-consecrators in Schlossberg's consecration.
 A line of succession from Gerardus Gul of the Old Catholic Union of Utrecht comes in via the Catholic Mariavite Church and Newman. There is a second or parallel path from Gul to Newman, via Arnold Harris Mathew, though some question the validity of that path.
 There is a line of succession via Newman from Church of England archbishops of Canterbury (and therefore stretching back in English history at least as far back as St Augustine of Canterbury (who arrived at Canterbury in 597). The line from archbishops of Canterbury flows via Scottish bishops and then North American bishops and bishops of the Reformed Episcopal Church in North America.

Numerous lines or streams of succession converge in Newman, thus forming what is, in effect, an ecumenical apostolic succession.

Publications
 Agama, DT Ancient Prayers For Today, 2011 Chakram Ltd, Manchester, England  
 Agama, DT A Word For Your Now, 2012 Chakam Publishing, Manchester, England (a booklet of 70 small pages) 

 Agama, DT An apostolic handbook. Volume two
 Agama, DT An apostolic handbook. Volume three, Ancient prayer secrets of the first apostles and the early church, 2015 Fastprint Publishing, Peterborough, England (a re-publication of Ancient Prayers For Today - see above)  
 Agama, DT Africa, Christianity and the Bible - Our Global Destiny, 2016 Fastprint Publishing, Peterborough, England 
 Agama, DT Strategic Leadership in the Charity Sector - a selection of perspectives'', 2016 Fastprint Publishing, Peterborough, England

Notes

References

21st-century English clergy
1956 births
Living people
English people of Nigerian descent
Nigerian Christian clergy